Chen Szu-yu (born 11 September 1994) is a Taiwanese badminton player.

Achievements

BWF International Challenge/Series 
Mixed doubles

  BWF International Challenge tournament
  BWF International Series tournament
  BWF Future Series tournament

References

External links 
 
 

1994 births
Living people
Taiwanese female badminton players
21st-century Taiwanese women